Fresno Missionary Baptist Institute and Seminary (FMBI) was established by the First Missionary Baptist Church of Fresno on September 10, 1978, under the leadership of Dr. Burel G Burnes. FMBI offers training courses for ministers and Christian workers. Currently, the school offers many courses in Christian education and theology including Biblical language courses. FMBI's current president is also Pastor of the First Missionary Baptist Church in Fresno, Dr. David M. Butimore Sr.

Educational institutions established in 1978
Education in Fresno, California
Seminaries and theological colleges in California
Unaccredited Christian universities and colleges in the United States
1978 establishments in California